Donald Nagle was an American marine, karate expert and instructor.

Biography

Nagle was a Marine; in the mid-1950s he was stationed on Okinawa, in the Ryukyu Islands off the coast of Japan. There he studied karate under Tatsuo Shimabuku, who had started the Isshin-Ryu school. He was promoted to 8th-degree black belt in 1966.

The IIKA (International Isshinryu Karate Association) promoted Don Nagle to 9th-Degree black belt on November 2, 1984.

He died on August 23, 1999, a day after heart surgery at the age 61.

References 

1938 births
1999 deaths
American male karateka
Sportspeople from Jersey City, New Jersey
United States Marines
Gōjū-ryū practitioners